Civic Center/Grand Park station is an underground rapid transit station on the B Line and D Line of the Los Angeles Metro Rail system. The station also has street level stops for the J Line of the Los Angeles Metro Busway system. The station is located under Hill Street at its intersection with 1st Street. It is located in the Civic Center neighborhood of Los Angeles, after which the station is named, alongside the nearby Grand Park.

The station is officially named Civic Center/Grand Park/Tom Bradley station after former Los Angeles mayor Tom Bradley, who had a pivotal role in turning the subway into reality.

Service

Station layout

Hours and frequency

Connections 
In addition to the rail and busway services, Civic Center/Grand Park station is a major hub for municipal bus lines. , the following connections are available:
 Antelope Valley Transit Authority: 785*
 Big Blue Bus (Santa Monica): Rapid10*
 City of Santa Clarita Transit: 799*
 Foothill Transit: Silver Streak, *, *, *, *, *, *
 LADOT Commuter Express: *, *, *, *, *, *, *, *, *
 LADOT DASH: A, B, D
 Montebello Bus Lines: 90Express*
 Torrance Transit: 4X*
Note: * indicates commuter service that operates only during weekday rush hours.

Notable places nearby 
The station is within walking distance of the following notable places:
 Ahmanson Theatre
 Cathedral of Our Lady of the Angels
 DoubleTree by Hilton Hotel Los Angeles Downtown
 Dorothy Chandler Pavilion
 Grand Park
 Little Tokyo
 Los Angeles City Hall
 Mark Taper Forum
 Museum of Contemporary Art (MOCA)
 The Broad
 Walt Disney Concert Hall

Station artwork 
The station features a colorful art installation titled I Dreamed I Could Fly, which has six fiberglass persons in flight, intended to be representative of the human spiritual voyage.  The installation was designed by Jonathan Borofsky.

References 

Los Angeles Metro Busway stations
Civic Center, Los Angeles
D Line (Los Angeles Metro) stations
B Line (Los Angeles Metro) stations
J Line (Los Angeles Metro)
Railway stations in the United States opened in 1993
Railway stations in Los Angeles
Buildings and structures in Downtown Los Angeles
1993 establishments in California